David Hume (1711–1776) was a Scottish philosopher, economist, and historian.

David Hume may also refer to:

 David Hume of Godscroft (1558–1629), Scottish historian and political theorist
 David Hume (advocate) (1757–1838), Scottish jurist and nephew of the philosopher
 David Hume (explorer) (1796–1864), South African explorer and big-game hunter
 David M. Hume (1917–1973), American doctor and pioneer in kidney disease research and treatment
 David Hume Kennerly (born 1947), American Pulitzer Prize–winning photographer
 David Hume (footballer) (1898–1964), Australian footballer
 David Hume, a character in the science-fiction TV series Total Recall 2070

See also
David Hulme (disambiguation)
David Home (disambiguation)